This is a list of African primates, containing all recent species of primates found in Africa including Madagascar. According to the IUCN/SSC Primate Specialist Group there are currently 216 species (111 in the mainland while the 105 are found in Madagascar). In addition the list also includes the recently extinct giant lemurs and humans (Homo sapiens) on the list. Each species is listed, with its binomial name.

Strepsirrhini (É. Geoffroy, 1812)

Lorisiformes (Gregory, 1915)

Lorisoidea (Gray, 1821)

Galagidae (Gray, 1825)
Euoticus (Gray, 1863) - needle-clawed galagos
Euoticus elegantulus (Le Conte, 1857) - southern needle-clawed galago
Euoticus pallidus (Gray, 1863) - northern needle-clawed galago
Galagoides (A. Smith, 1833) - dwarf galagos
Galagoides thomasi (Elliot, 1907) - Thomas's galago
Galagoides orinus (Lawrence & Washburn, 1936) - Uluguru galago 
Galagoides rondoensis (Honess, 1997) - Rondo galago
Galagoides demidovii (G. Fischer, 1806) - Prince Demidoff's galago
Sciurocheirus (Gray, 1872) - squirrel galagos
Sciurocheirus gabonensis (Gray, 1863) - Gabon galago
Sciurocheirus cameronensis (Peters, 1876) - Cross River galago
Sciurocheirus alleni (Waterhouse, 1838) - Bioko Allen's galago
Otolemur (Coquerel, 1859) - greater bushbabies
Otolemur garnettii (Ogilby, 1838) - northern greater galago
Otolemur monteiri (Bartlett, 1863) - silvery greater galago
Otolemur crassicaudatus (É Geoffroy, 1812) - brown greater galago
Galago (É. Geoffroy, 1796) - lesser galagos
Galago zanzibaricus (Matschie, 1893) - Zanzibar galago
Galago granti (Thomas & Wroughton, 1907) - Grant's galago
Galago matschiei (Lorenz, 1917) - dusky galago
Galago senegalensis (É. Geoffroy, 1796) - senegal galago
Galago nyasae (Elliot, 1907) - Malawi galago
Galago moholi (A. Smith, 1836) - Mohol galago
Galago gallarum (Thomas, 1901) - Somali galago
Lorisidae (Gray, 1821)
Perodicticinae (Gray, 1870)
Arctocebus (Gray, 1863) - angwantibos
Arctocebus calabarensis (Smith, 1860) - Calabar angwantibo
Arctocebus aureusde (Winton, 1902) - golden angwantibo
Pseudopotto (Schwartz, 1996)
Pseudopotto martini (Schwartz, 1996) - false potto
Perodicticus (Bennett, 1830)
Perodicticus potto (Statius Müller, 1766) - potto

Lemuriformes (Gray, 1821)

Daubentonioidea (Gray, 1863)

Daubentoniidae (Gray, 1863)
Daubentonia (É. Geoffroy, 1795)
†Daubentonia robusta (Lamberton, 1935) - giant aye-aye
Daubentonia madagascariensis (Gmelin, 1788) - aye-aye

Cheirogaleoidea (Gray, 1872)

Lepilemuridae (Gray, 1870)
Lepilemur (I. Geoffroy, 1851) - sportive lemurs
Lepilemur hubbardorum (Louis, Jr, 2006) - Hubbard's sportive lemur
Lepilemur wrightae (Louis, Jr, 2006) - Wright's sportive lemur
Lepilemur hollandorum (Ramaromilanto & Lei, 2008) - Holland's sportive lemur
Lepilemur scottorum (Lei et al., 2008) - Scott's sportive lemur
Lepilemur seali (Louis, Jr, 2006) - Seal's sportive lemur
Lepilemur fleuretae (Louis, Jr, 2006) - Fleurete's sportive lemur
Lepilemur jamesorum (Louis, Jr, 2006) - James' sportive lemur
Lepilemur betsileo (Louis, Jr, 2006) - betsileo sportive lemur
Lepilemur mustelinus (I. Geoffroy, 1851) - weasel sportive lemur
Lepilemur aeeclis (Andriaholinirina, N. et al., 2006) - Antafia sportive lemur
Lepilemur randrianasoloi (Andriaholinirina, N. et al., 2006) - Randrianasolo's sportive lemur
Lepilemur leucopus (Major, 1894) - white-footed sportive lemur
Lepilemur petteri (Louis, Jr, 2006) - Petter's sportive lemur
Lepilemur microdon (Forsyth Major, 1894) - small-toothed sportive lemur
Lepilemur otto (Craul et al., 2007) - Otto's sportive lemur
Lepilemur mittermeieri (Rabarivola et al., 2006) - Mittermeier's sportive lemur
Lepilemur grewcockorum (Louis, Jr, 2006) - Grewcock's sportive lemur
Lepilemur edwardsi (Forsyth Major, 1894) - Milne-Edwards' sportive lemur
Lepilemur ruficaudatus (Grandidier, 1867) - red-tailed sportive lemur
Lepilemur septentrionalis (Rumpler & Albignac, 1975) - northern sportive lemur
Lepilemur dorsalis (Gray, 1870) - gray-backed sportive lemur
Lepilemur sahamalazensis (Andriaholinirina, N. et al., 2006) - Sahamalaza sportive lemur
Lepilemur ahmansonorum (Louis, Jr, 2006) - Ahmanson's sportive lemur
Lepilemur tymerlachsonorum (Louis, Jr. et al., 2006) - Hawks' sportive lemur
Lepilemur milanoii (Louis, Jr, 2006) - Daraina sportive lemur
Lepilemur ankaranensis (Rumpler & Albignac, 1975) - Ankarana sportive lemur
Phaneridae (Rumpler, 1974)
Phaner (Gray, 1870) - fork-crowned lemurs
Phaner furcifer (Blainville, 1839) - Masoala fork-crowned lemur
Phaner parienti (Groves & Tattersall, 1991) - Pariente's fork-crowned lemur
Phaner pallescens (Groves and Tattersall, 1991) - pale fork-crowned lemur
Phaner electromontis (Groves and Tattersall, 1991) - Amber Mountain fork-marked lemur
Cheirogaleidae (Gray, 1873)
Allocebus (Petter-Rousseaux and Petter, 1967) 
Allocebus trichotis (Günther, 1875) - hairy-eared dwarf lemur
Mirza (Gray, 1870) - giant mouse lemurs
Mirza zaza (Kappeler & Roos, 2005) - northern giant mouse lemur
Mirza coquereli (A. Grandidier, 1867) - southern giant mouse lemur
Microcebus (É. Geoffroy, 1834) - lesser mouse lemurs
Microcebus lehilahytsara (Roos & Kappeler, 2005) - Goodman's mouse lemur
Microcebus berthae (Rasoloarison et al., 2000) - Madame Berthe's mouse lemur
Microcebus ganzhorni (Hotaling et al., 2016) - Ganzhorn's mouse lemur
Microcebus tanosi (Rasoloarison et al., 2013) - Anosy mouse lemur
Microcebus myoxinus (Peters, 1852) - pygmy mouse lemur
Microcebus griseorufus (Kollman, 1910) - reddish-gray mouse lemur
Microcebus murinus (Miller, 1777) - gray mouse lemur
Microcebus bongolavensis (Olivieri et al., 2007) - Bongolava mouse lemur
Microcebus mamiratra (Andriantompohavana et al., 2006) - Claire's mouse lemur
Microcebus danfossi (Olivieri et al., 2006) - Danfoss' mouse lemur
Microcebus ravelobensis (Zimmerman et al., 1998) - golden-brown mouse lemur
Microcebus macarthurii (Radespiel et al., 2008) - MacArthur's mouse lemur
Microcebus tavaratra (Rasoloarison et al., 2000) - northern rufous mouse lemur
Microcebus gerpi (Radespiel et al., 2012) - Gerp's mouse lemur
Microcebus jollyae (Louis et al., 2006) - Jolly's mouse lemur
Microcebus simmonsi (Louis et al., 2006) - Simmons' mouse lemur
Microcebus mittermeieri (Louis et al., 2006) - Mittermeier's mouse lemur
Microcebus marohita (Rasoloarison et al., 2013) - Marohita mouse lemur
Microcebus rufus (É. Geoffroy, 1834) - brown mouse lemur
Microcebus sambiranensis (Rasoloarison et al., 2000) - Sambirano mouse lemur
Microcebus arnholdi (E. Louis, Jr., et al. 2008) - Arnhold's mouse lemur
Microcebus margotmarshae (Andriantompohavana et al., 2006) - Margot Marsh's mouse lemur
Cheirogaleus (É. Geoffroy, 1812) - greater dwarf lemurs
Cheirogaleus minusculus (Groves, 2000) - lesser iron-gray dwarf lemur
Cheirogaleus medius (É. Geoffroy, 1812) - fat-tailed dwarf lemur
Cheirogaleus sibreei (Forsyth Major, 1896) - Sibree's dwarf lemur
Cheirogaleus major (É. Geoffroy, 1812) - Geoffroy's dwarf lemur
Cheirogaleus crossleyi (A. Grandidier, 1870) - furry-eared dwarf lemur
Cheirogaleus lavasoensis (Thiele et al., 2013) - Lavasoa dwarf lemur

Indrioidea (Burnett, 1828)

†Archaeolemuridae (Forsyth Major, 1896)
†Hadropithecus (Lorenz von Liburnau, 1899)
†Hadropithecus stenognathus (Lorenz von Liburnau, 1899) - kidoky
†Archaeolemur (Filhol, 1895) - baboon lemurs
†Archaeolemur majori (Filhol, 1895) - Major's baboon lemur
†Archaeolemur edwardsi (Filhol, 1895) - Milne-Edward's baboon lemur
Indriidae (Burnett, 1828)
Avahi (Jourdan, 1834) - woolly lemurs
Avahi mooreorum (Lei, 2008) - Moore's woolly lemur
Avahi occidentalis (Lorenz-Liburnau, 1898) - western woolly lemur
Avahi cleesei (Thalmann & Geissmann, 2005) - Bemaraha woolly lemur
Avahi unicolor (Thalmann & Geissmann, 2000) - Sambirano woolly lemur
Avahi laniger (Gmelin, 1788) - eastern woolly lemur
Avahi betsileo (Adriantompohavana et al., 2007) - Betsileo woolly lemur
Avahi peyrierasi (Zaramody et al., 2006) - Peyrieras's woolly lemur
Avahi meridionalis (Zaramody et al., 2006) - southern woolly lemur
Avahi ramanantsoavani (Zaramody et al., 2006) - Ramanantsoavana's woolly lemur
Propithecus (Bennett, 1832) - sifakas
Propithecus coronatus (Milne-Edwards, 1871) - crowned sifaka
Propithecus tattersalli (Simons, 1988) - golden-crowned sifaka
Propithecus coquereli (A. Grandidier, 1867) - Coquerel's sifaka
Propithecus deckenii (Peters, 1870) - Von der Decken's sifaka
Propithecus verreauxi (A. Grandidier, 1867) - Verreaux's sifaka
Propithecus candidus (A. Grandidier, 1871) - silky sifaka
Propithecus perrieri (Lavauden, 1931) - Perrier's sifaka
Propithecus edwardsi (A. Grandidier, 1871) - Milne-Edwards's sifaka
Propithecus diadema (Bennett, 1832) - diademed sifaka
Indri (É. Geoffroy & G. Cuvier, 1796)
Indri indri (Gmelin, 1788) - indri
†Palaeopropithecidae (Tattersall, 1973)
†Mesopropithecus (Standing, 1905) - gibbon lemurs
†Mesopropithecus globiceps (Standing, 1905) - southern gibbon lemur
†Mesopropithecus pithecoides (Standing, 1905) - central gibbon lemur
†Mesopropithecus dolichobrachion (Standing, 1905) - northern gibbon lemur
†Babakotia (Godfrey et al., 1990)
†Babakotia radofilai (Godfrey et al., 1990) - babakoto
†Archaeoindris (Standing, 1909)
†Archaeoindris fontoynontii (Standing, 1909) - ground sloth lemur
†Palaeopropithecus (G. Grandidier, 1899) - tree sloth lemurs
†Palaeopropithecus maximus (Standing, 1903) - central sloth lemur
†Palaeopropithecus ingens (G. Grandider, 1899) - tratratraztra
†Palaeopropithecus kelyus  (Gommery & al., 2009) -  Kel's sloth lemur

Lemuroidea (Gray 1821)

†Megaladapidae (Forsyth Major, 1894)
†Megaladapis (Forsyth Major, 1894) - koala lemurs
†Megaladapis edwardsi (Grandidier, 1899) - Milne-Edward's koala lemur
†Megaladapis grandidieri (Standing, 1905) - Grandidier's koala lemur
†Megaladapis madagascariensis (Forsyth Major, 1894) - tokandia
Lemuridae (Gray, 1821)
†Pachylemur (Lamberton, 1948) - giant ruffed lemurs
†Pachylemur insignis (Filhol, 1895) - central giant ruffed lemur
†Pachylemur jullyi (G. Grandidier, 1899) - central giant ruffed lemur
Varecia (Gray, 1863) - ruffed lemurs
Varecia rubra (É. Geoffroy, 1812) - red ruffed lemur
Varecia variegata (Kerr, 1792) - black-and-white ruffed lemur
Eulemur (Simons & Rumpler, 1988) - brown lemurs
Eulemur coronatus (Gray, 1842) - crowned lemur
Eulemur rubriventer (I. Geoffroy, 1850) - red-bellied lemur
Eulemur mongoz (Linnaeus, 1766) - mongoose lemur
Eulemur flavifrons (Gray, 1867) - blue-eyed black lemur
Eulemur macaco (Linnaeus, 1766) - black lemur
Eulemur cinereiceps (Grandidier & Milne-Edwards, 1890) - gray-headed lemur
Eulemur rufifrons (Bennett, 1833) - red-fronted lemur
Eulemur sanfordi (Archbold, 1932) - Sanford's brown lemur
Eulemur collaris (É. Geoffroy, 1817) - collared brown lemur
Eulemur albifrons (É. Geoffroy, 1796) - white-headed lemur
Eulemur fulvus (É. Geoffroy, 1796) - common brown lemur
Eulemur rufus (Audebert, 1799) - red lemur
Prolemur (Gray, 1871)
Prolemur simus (Gray, 1871) - greater bamboo lemur
Hapalemur (I. Geoffrey, 1851) - bamboo lemurs
Hapalemur aureus (Meier, Albignac et al., 1987) - golden bamboo lemur
Hapalemur occidentalis (Rumpler, 1975) - western bamboo lemur
Hapalemur alaotrensis (Rumpler, 1975) - Lac Alaotra bamboo lemur
Hapalemur meridionalis (Warter, et al., 1987) - southern bamboo lemur
Hapalemur griseus (Link, 1795) - eastern bamboo lemur
Lemur (Linnaeus, 1758)
Lemur catta (Linnaeus, 1758) - ring-tailed lemur

Haplorhini (Pocock, 1918)

Simiiformes (Haeckel, 1866)

Cercopithecoidea (Gray, 1821)

Colobidae (Jerdon, 1867)
Procolobus (Rochebrune, 1877)
Procolobus verus (van Beneden, 1838) - olive colobus
Piliocolobus (Rochebrune, 1877) - red colossuses
Piliocolobus rufomitratus (Peters, 1879) - Tana River red colobus
Piliocolobus preussi (Matschie, 1900) - Preuss's red colobus
Piliocolobus epieni (Grubb & Powell, 1999) - Niger Delta red colobus
Piliocolobus badius (Kerr, 1792) - western red colobus
Piliocolobus pennantii (Waterhouse, 1838) - Pennant's colobus
Piliocolobus tephrosceles (Elliot, 1907) - Ugandan red colobus
Piliocolobus kirkii (Gray, 1868) - Zanzibar red colobus
Piliocolobus gordonorum (Matschie, 1900) - Udzungwa red colobus
Piliocolobus foai (de Pousargues, 1899) - Central African red colobus
Piliocolobus  tholloni (Milne-Edwards, 1886) - Thollon's red colobus
Colobus (Illiger, 1811) - black-and-white colossuses
Colobus satanas (Waterhouse, 1838) - black colobus
Colobus angolensis (P. Sclater, 1860) - Angola colobus
Colobus guereza (Rüppell, 1835) - mantled guereza
Colobus vellerosus (I. Geoffroy, 1834) - white-thighed colobus
Colobus polykomos (Zimmermann, 1780) - king colobus
Cercopithecidae (Gray, 1821)
Papioninae (Groves, 1989)
Macaca (Lacépède, 1799) - macaques
Macaca sylvanus (Linnaeus, 1758) - Barbary macaque
Lophocebus (Palmer, 1903) - crested mangabeys
Lophocebus johnstoni (Lydekker, 1900) - Johnston's mangabey
Lophocebus osmani (Groves, 1978) - Osman Hill's mangabey
Lophocebus aterrimus (Oudemans, 1890) - black crested mangabey
Lophocebus ugandae (Matschie, 1912) - Uganda mangabey
Lophocebus albigena (Gray, 1850) - grey-cheeked mangabey
Lophocebus opdenboschi (Scouteden, 1944) - Opdenbosch's mangabey
Theropithecus (I. Geoffroy, 1843)
Theropithecus gelada (Rüppell, 1835) - gelada
Mandrillus (Ritgen, 1824) - forest baboons
Mandrillus leucophaeus (F. Cuvier, 1807) - drill
Mandrillus sphinx (Linnaeus, 1758) - mandrill
Cercocebus (É. Geoffroy, 1812) - white-eyelid mangabeys
Cercocebus sanjei (Mittermeier, 1986) - Sanje mangabey
Cercocebus galeritus (Peters, 1879) - Tana River mangabey
Cercocebus chrysogaster (Lydekker, 1900) - golden-bellied mangabey
Cercocebus agilis (Milne-Edwards, 1886) - agile mangabey
Cercocebus atys (Audebert, 1797) - sooty mangabey
Cercocebus torquatus (Kerr, 1792) - collared mangabey
Rungwecebus (Davenport, 2006)
Rungwecebus kipunji (Jones et al., 2005) - kipunji
Papio (Erxleben, 1777) - savannah baboons
Papio papio (Desmarest, 1820) - guinea baboon
Papio ursinus (Kerr, 1792) - chacma baboon
Papio cynocephalus (Linnaeus, 1766) - yellow baboon
Papio hamadryas (Linnaeus, 1758) - hamadryas baboon
Papio anubis (Lesson, 1827) - olive baboon
Cercopithecinae (Gray, 1821)
Allenopithecus (Lang, 1923)
Allenopithecus nigroviridis (Pocock, 1907) - Allen's swamp monkey
Miopithecus (I. Geoffroy, 1842) - talapoins
Miopithecus ogouensis (Kingdon, 1997) - Gabon talapoin
Miopithecus talapoin (Schreber, 1774) - Angolan talapoin
Chlorocebus (Gray, 1870) - savanna guenons
Chlorocebus tantalus (Ogilby, 1841) - tantalus guenon
Chlorocebus cynosuros (Scopoli, 1786) - Malbrouck guenon
Chlorocebus djamdjamensis (Neumann, 1902) - Bale Mountains guenon
Chlorocebus aethiops (Linnaeus, 1758) - Grivet
Chlorocebus pygerythrus (F. Cuvier, 1821) - vervet monkey
Chlorocebus sabaeus (Linnaeus, 1758) - green monkey
Erythrocebus (Trouessart, 1897)
Erythrocebus patas (Schreber, 1775) - patas monkey
Cercopithecus (Linnaeus, 1758) - forest guenons
Cercopithecus solatus (M. J. S. Harrison, 1988) - sun-tailed guenon
Cercopithecus preussi (Matschie, 1898) - Preuss's monkey
Cercopithecus lhoesti (P. Sclater, 1899) - L'Hoest's monkey
Cercopithecus hamlyni (Pocock, 1907) - Hamlyn's monkey
Cercopithecus lomamiensis (Hart et al., 2012) - lesula
Cercopithecus neglectus (Schlegel, 1876) - De Brazza's monkey
Cercopithecus pogonias (Bennett, 1833) - crested mona monkey
Cercopithecus denti (Thomas, 1907) - Dent's mona monkey
Cercopithecus wolfi (Meyer, 1891) - Wolf's mona monkey
Cercopithecus mona (Schreber, 1774) - mona monkey
Cercopithecus lowei (Thomas, 1923) - Lowe's mona monkey
Cercopithecus campbelli (Waterhouse, 1838) - Campbell's mona monkey
Cercopithecus dryas (Schwarz, 1932) - Dryas monkey
Cercopithecus roloway (Schreber, 1774) - roloway monkey
Cercopithecus diana (Linnaeus, 1758) - Diana monkey
Cercopithecus nictitans (Linnaeus, 1766) - greater spot-nosed monkey
Cercopithecus albogularis (Sykes, 1831) - Sykes' monkey
Cercopithecus mitis (Wolf, 1822) - blue monkey
Cercopithecus doggetti (Pocock, 1907) - silver monkey
Cercopithecus kandti (Matschie, 1905) - golden monkey
Cercopithecus petaurista (Schreber, 1774) - lesser spot-nosed guenon
Cercopithecus erythrotis (Waterhouse, 1838) - red-eared guenon
Cercopithecus cephus (Linnaeus, 1758) - moustached guenon
Cercopithecus ascanius (Audebert, 1799) - red-tailed guenon
Cercopithecus sclateri (Pocock, 1904) - Sclater's guenon
Cercopithecus erythrogaster (Gray, 1866) - white-throated guenon

Hominoidea (Gray, 1825)

Hominidae (Gray, 1825)
Gorilla (I. Geoffroy, 1852)
Gorilla beringei (Matschie, 1903) - eastern gorilla
Gorilla gorilla (Savage, 1847) - Western gorilla
Pan (Oken, 1816)
Pan paniscus (Schwarz, 1929) - bonobo
Pan troglodytes (Blumenbach, 1776) - Chimpanzee
Homo (Linnaeus, 1758)
Homo sapiens (Linnaeus, 1758) - human

See also
List of primates

References

Further reading
Garbutt, N. (2007). Mammals of Madagascar: A Complete Guide. Yale University Press.
Haltenorth, T., & Diller, H. (1980). A Field Guide to the Mammals of Africa including Madagascar.
Kingdon, J., Happold, D., Butynski, T., Hoffmann, M., Happold, M., & Kalina, J. (2013). Mammals of Africa (Vol. 2). A&C Black.
Petter, J. J., & Desbordes, F. (2013). Primates of the World: An Illustrated Guide. Princeton University Press.
Nowak, R. M. (1999). Walker's Primates of the World. JHU Press.

External links
Primate Specialist Group
West African Primate Conservation Action (WAPCA)
African Primates: Status Survey and Conservation Action Plan (SSC species action plans)

'
primates